Bangladesh Krira Shikkha Protishtan football team is a football team from  Bangladesh, which represents the national sports academy, Bangladesh Krira Shikkha Protishtan, and began playing professional football in Bangladesh in the mid 2000s. They currently participate in the Dhaka Second Division Football League, which is the fourth tier of Bangladeshi football. The team consists of players under the age of 18, and has produced many professional footballers that have went onto play for the Bangladesh national football team and youth national teams.

History
BKSP's football a activities started from 1986 with only 30 trainees and 2 coaches. In 2016, BKSP's  Football Trainee Admission Program started, and the institution has setup training centers in Khulna, Dinajpur, Barisal and Sylhet. Former national team captains Mamunul Islam and Hassan Al-Mamun, along with many other notable football players have spent their youth careers at the institution. Some of the institutions early success was found through the BKSP U-14 team, which won the Dana Cup in Denmark in 1990 and also the Gothia Cup in Sweden.

During the 2013 Bangladesh Games, BKSP were crowned champions in football, after defeating Barisal District 2-1 in the final at the Bangabandhu National Stadium. Both goals came from forward Rohit Sarkar, who was later called up for the Bangladesh U20 team. In 2016, BKSP U14 team won the Subroto Cup sub-junior football tournament, and two years later they won the U-17 football tournament, both of which were held in India.

BKSP were crowned champions of the 2017 Walton U-18 National Football Championship, defeating Dhaka District team on penalties. In 2020, BKSP achieved one of their most notable victories by defeating Bangladesh Army in the services-zone final of the 2020 Bangabandhu National Football Championship.

In 2022, BKSP partook in the Dhaka Second Division Football League, which started after a two year gap. On 10 August 2022, BKSP defeated Bikrampur Kings 2-1, in the first game of the 2021–22 Dhaka Second Division Football League season. Muhammad Imon and Al-Mirad scored the goals for the team.

Competitive record
BKSP has started their professional football campaign from the mid 2000s.

Honours

Youth tournaments
U-14 Gothia Cup
Winner (1): 1990
U-14 Dana Cup
Winner (1): 1990
U-18 National Football Championship
Winner (1): 2017
Bangladesh Games
Winner (1): 2013
U-17 Subroto Cup
Winner (1): 2018
Runners-up (1): 2019
U-14 Subroto Cup
Winner (1): 2016
Runners-up (2): 2008, 2003

See also
 Bangladesh Krira Shikkha Protishtan

References

Football clubs in Bangladesh
Sport in Bangladesh
Football academies in Asia
Youth football in Bangladesh
1986 establishments in Bangladesh